Christopher Guinness  (born 22 November 1981) is an animator and art director from Trinidad and Tobago. Graduating from Sheridan College in Ontario, Canada, he is a multi-award winner in the Caribbean advertising and animation circuit.

Career
Guinness has worked at two agencies: McCann Erickson and Lonsdale Saatchi and Saatchi.

At McCann Erickson he took the job title of a graphic artist, winning the 2006 Animae Caribe Most Successful Commercial Animation Award for his work on the bmobile Passion Anime (Fifa World Cup 2006) television commercial. He would later win the AAF US National Gold ADDY Awards in the category of "Animation or Special Effects Video, Film", making him the first and only Caribbean national to date to win at the final stage of the ADDY Awards.

In 2007 after leaving McCann Erickson, Guinness took the position of Art Director at Lonsdale Saatchi and Saatchi. His work on the "it matters" campaign won the Western Union's North American/Caribbean advertising account in October 2007. The "it matters" campaign went on to win six Awards in 2008 at the 9th AAATT Advertising Awards including the "Best Integrated Campaign of the Year" award. Lonsdale Saatchi and Saatchi also won 33 awards that night. Guinness won 18 awards in 2009 at the CAF ADDY Awards including Best of Show Overall for the body of work on Western Union, Best of Show Print for the "it matters" Support Ad and Best of Show TV for the Blink Olympic Television Commercial.

In 2010 Guinness's work on Volvo gained him his second AAF US National ADDY Award in the category of "Video Sales Presentation". Animal Instinct, a spot for the 2010 FIFA world Cup garnered him a 2010 Animae Caribe Best Use of Animation in the Media Award, along with three CAF Gold ADDYs, the 2011 CAF Addys Judge's Choice for Creative Excellence, three 4AAF Gold ADDYs, the 2011 4AAF Charlie Award for Self Promotion, the 7th TIAF Best Advertisement Animation Award and a Silver ADDY at the AAF US National ADDY Awards. Recently, His short film Pothound for the TTSPCA was nominated for a 2012 Vimeo Award. Its follow up Captain T&T became the first film from the Caribbean to screen at the San Diego Comic Con International Film Festival.

Guinness now owns and operates a design, film and animation agency and has served as the President of the Caribbean Advertising Federation. He has won more than 90 awards locally, regionally and internationally.

Notable awards and selections
 2006 Animae Caribe Awards: Most Successful Commercial Animation - bmobile Passion Anime (Fifa World Cup 2006)
 2007 CAF Gold ADDY Awards: Television - bmobile Passion Anime (Fifa World Cup 2006)
 2007 CAF Gold ADDY Awards: Animation or Special Effects Video, Film - bmobile Passion Anime (Fifa World Cup 2006)
 2007 CAF ADDY Awards: Judges Choice Best Art Direction - bmobile Passion Anime (Fifa World Cup 2006)
 2007 AAF District 4 Gold ADDY Awards: Animation or Special Effects Video, Film - bmobile Passion Anime (Fifa World Cup 2006)
 2007 AAF US National Gold ADDY Awards: Animation or Special Effects Video, Film - bmobile Passion Anime (Fifa World Cup 2006)
 2008 CAF Silver ADDY Awards: Television - Coca-Cola Cans Multi-brand
 2008 CAF Silver ADDY Awards: Television - Green Sands Snake
 2008 CAF Silver ADDY Awards: Television - Green Sands UFO
 2008 AAF District 4 Gold ADDY Awards: Local TV - Green Sands TV
 2008 AAF District 4 Gold ADDY Awards: Mixed-Media, Local Consumer - Green Sands
 2008 Advertising Agency Association of Trinidad and Tobago Design: Agency Self Promotion - "It's like Killing Yourself"
 2008 AAATT Design: Internet Site/Web Page Design - Western Union "it matters"
 2008 AAATT Corporate/Institutional: Television - Western Union "it matters"
 2008 AAATT Financial Products and Services: Press - Western Union "it matters"
 2008 AAATT Financial Products and Services: Jingle - Western Union "it matters"
 2008 AAATT Financial Products and Services: Integrated Campaign - Western Union "it matters"
 2008 AAATT BEST OF SHOW: Integrated Campaign - Western Union "it matters"
 Ads of the World November 2008 Best From Emerging Market - Western Union "it matters"
 2009 CAF Silver ADDY Awards: Campaign - "It's like Killing Yourself" D&D
 2009 CAF Silver ADDY Awards: TV/Broadcast - "It's like Killing Yourself" D&D
 2009 CAF Silver ADDY Awards: Outdoor Board - Western Union "it matters" School
 2009 CAF Silver ADDY Awards: Outdoor Board - Western Union "it matters" Shelter
 2009 CAF Silver ADDY Awards: Photography Campaign - Western Union "it matters"
 2009 CAF Silver ADDY Awards: Photography - Western Union "it matters"
 2009 CAF Silver ADDY Awards: Newspaper Campaign - Western Union "it matters"
 2009 CAF Gold ADDY Awards: Campaign - Western Union "it matters"
 2009 CAF Gold ADDY Awards: Cinematography - Western Union "it matters"
 2009 CAF Gold ADDY Awards: Online - Western Union "it matters" Christmas
 2009 CAF Gold ADDY Awards: Animation or Special Effects - Western Union "it matters" Christmas Card
 2009 CAF Gold ADDY Awards: Full Page Ad - Western Union "it matters" Support
 2009 CAF Gold ADDY Awards: Full Page Ad - Western Union "it matters" School
 2009 CAF Gold ADDY Awards: Animation or Special Effects - Blink Olympics
 2009 CAF Gold ADDY Awards: TV/Broadcast - Blink Olympics
 2009 CAF ADDY Awards: BEST OF SHOW TV - Blink Olympics
 2009 CAF ADDY Awards: BEST OF SHOW PRINT - Western Union "it matters" Support
 2009 CAF ADDY Awards: BEST OF SHOW OVERALL - Western Union "it matters"
 2009 AAF District 4 Silver ADDY Awards: Animation or Special Effects - Blink Olympics
 2009 AAF District 4 Silver ADDY Awards: TV/Broadcast - Blink Olympics
 2009 AAF District 4 Silver ADDY Awards: TV/Broadcast - Western Union
 2009 AAF District 4 Silver ADDY Awards: Online/E-Card - Western Union Christmas
 2010 CAF Silver ADDY Awards: Self Promotion - Lonsdale Saatchi & Saatchi Campaign
 2010 CAF Silver ADDY Awards: Press - Angostura Don't Drive & Drive
 2010 CAF Silver ADDY Awards: Local TV - Caribbean Games
 2010 CAF Silver ADDY Awards: Online - Caribbean Games
 2010 CAF Silver ADDY Awards: Jingle - Caribbean Games
 2010 CAF Gold ADDY Awards: Audio/Visual Sales Presentation - Volvo Viral
 2010 AAF District 4 Gold ADDY Awards: Audio/Visual Sales Presentation - Volvo Viral
 2010 AAF US National Silver ADDY Awards: Audio/Visual Sales Presentation - Volvo Viral
 2010 Animae Caribe Awards: Best Use of Animation in the Media - Animal Instinct (FIFA World Cup 2010)
 2011 CAF Gold ADDY Awards: Interactive Self Promotion - Animal Instinct (FIFA World Cup 2010)
 2011 CAF Gold ADDY Awards: Animation or Special Effects Video, Film - Animal Instinct (FIFA World Cup 2010)
 2011 CAF Gold ADDY Awards: Animation or Special Effects Internet - Animal Instinct (FIFA World Cup 2010)
 2011 CAF ADDY Awards: The Judges Choice Award for Creative Excellence - Animal Instinct (FIFA World Cup 2010)
 2011 AAF District 4 Gold ADDY Awards: Interactive Self Promotion - Animal Instinct (FIFA World Cup 2010)
 2011 AAF District 4 Gold ADDY Awards: Animation or Special Effects Video, Film - Animal Instinct (FIFA World Cup 2010)
 2011 AAF District 4 Gold ADDY Awards: Animation or Special Effects Internet - Animal Instinct (FIFA World Cup 2010)
 2011 AAF District 4 Charlie Award: BEST OF SELF PROMOTION - Animal Instinct (FIFA World Cup 2010)
 2011 AAF US National Silver ADDY Awards: Animation or Special Effects Video, Film - Animal Instinct (FIFA World Cup 2010)
 7th Tehran International Animation Festival: Best Advertisement Animation Award - Animal Instinct (FIFA World Cup 2010)
 2011 TTFF The Best of Animae Caribe 2010 - Animal Instinct (FIFA World Cup 2010)
 2011 NYCIFF Official Selection - Animal Instinct (FIFA World Cup 2010)
 2011 AniFestROZAFA Official Selection - Animal Instinct (FIFA World Cup 2010)
 2011 ANIMPACT Max Official Selection - Animal Instinct (FIFA World Cup 2010)
 2012 CAF Silver ADDY Awards: Public Service Broadcast/Electronic - TTSPCA "Pothound (2011) - A Short Film"
 2012 CAF Silver ADDY Awards: Non-Traditional Advertisement - TTSPCA "Pothound (2011) - A Short Film"
 2012 CAF Gold ADDY Awards: Cinematography - TTSPCA "Pothound (2011) - A Short Film"
 2012 CAF Gold ADDY Awards: Animation or Special Effects, Internet - TTSPCA "Pothound (2011) - A Short Film"
 2012 Selento Finibus Terrae Film Festival Official Selection - TTSPCA "Pothound (2011) - A Short Film"
 2012 World Kids International Film Festival Official Selection - TTSPCA "Pothound (2011) - A Short Film"
 2012 Short & Sweet TV London Screenings - TTSPCA "Pothound (2011) - A Short Film"
 2012 The Indie Fest: Award of Merit - TTSPCA "Pothound (2011) - A Short Film"
 2012 American International Film Festival: Best Animation - TTSPCA "Pothound (2011) - A Short Film"
 2012 Caribbean Tales Film Festival Official Selection - TTSPCA "Pothound (2011) - A Short Film"
 2012 New York International Film Festival Official Selection - TTSPCA "Pothound (2011) - A Short Film"
 2012 Asians on Film Festival Official Selection - TTSPCA "Pothound (2011) - A Short Film"
 2012 Asians on Film Festival – Best Cinematography – Short Form - TTSPCA "Pothound (2011) - A Short Film"
 2012 Fandana Film Festival Official Selection - TTSPCA "Pothound (2011) - A Short Film"
 2012 Corti da Sogni Official Selection - TTSPCA "Pothound (2011) - A Short Film"
 2012 Vimeo Awards Narrative Finalist - TTSPCA "Pothound (2011) - A Short Film"
 2013 Best Short Film: Lleida Latin-American Film Festival Best  - TTSPCA "Pothound (2011) - A Short Film"
 2013 Vimeo Staff Pick - "Captain T&T (2013) - A Short Film"
 2013 Aruba Film Festival Official Selection - "Captain T&T (2013) - A Short Film"
 2013 Caribbean Tales Film Festival Official Selection - "Captain T&T (2013) - A Short Film"
 2013 Caribbean Film Corner Official Selection - "Captain T&T (2013) - A Short Film"
 2013 Tampere Film Festival Finland Official Selection - "Captain T&T (2013) - A Short Film"
 2014 CAF Gold ADDY Awards: Cinematography - "Captain T&T (2013) - A Short Film"
 2014 CAF Gold ADDY Awards: Public Service - "Captain T&T (2013) - A Short Film"
 2014 CAF ADDY Awards: Judges Choice for Public Service - "Captain T&T (2013) - A Short Film"
 2014 AAF District 4 Gold ADDY Awards: Cinematography - "Captain T&T (2013) - A Short Film"
 2014 AAF District 4 Gold ADDY Awards: Public Service - "Captain T&T (2013) - A Short Film"
 2014 AAF US National Gold ADDY Awards: Cinematography - "Captain T&T (2013) - A Short Film"
 2014 Dieciminuti Film Festival- Italy Award of Best Short Film in the Extralarge Selection - "Captain T&T (2013) - A Short Film"
 2014 San Diego Comic Con International Film Festival Official Selection - "Captain T&T (2013) - A Short Film"
 2015 Aruba Film Festival Official Selection - "Fade to Black (2015) - A Short Film"
 2015 International Film Awards Berlin - Best Cinematography - "Fade to Black (2015) - A Short Film"
 2015 Trinidad and Tobago Film Festival - Best Short Film - Fiction - "Fade to Black (2015) - A Short Film"

References

External links
 Official website
 Company website

1981 births
Trinidad and Tobago animators
Animated film directors
Businesspeople in advertising
Living people
Art directors
Sheridan College alumni